This is a list of the mammal species recorded in Fiji. There are fifteen mammal species in Fiji, of which one is critically endangered, one is endangered, and three are vulnerable.

The following tags are used to highlight each species' conservation status as assessed by the International Union for Conservation of Nature:

Order: Carnivora (carnivorans)

There are over 260 species of carnivorans, the majority of which eat meat as their primary dietary item. They have a characteristic skull shape and dentition.
Family: Herpestidae
Genus: Urva
 Indian brown mongoose, U. fusca, introduced
 Small Indian mongoose, U. auropunctata  introduced

Order: Chiroptera (bats) 

The bats' most distinguishing feature is that their forelimbs are developed as wings, making them the only mammals capable of flight. Bat species account for about 20% of all mammals.

Family: Pteropodidae (flying foxes, Old World fruit bats)
Subfamily: Pteropodinae
Genus: Mirimiri
 Fijian monkey-faced bat, Mirimiri acrodonta 
Genus: Pteropus
 Samoa flying-fox, Pteropus samoensis 
 Insular flying-fox, Pteropus tonganus 
Subfamily: Macroglossinae
Genus: Notopteris
 Long-tailed fruit bat, Notopteris macdonaldi 
Family: Molossidae
Genus: Chaerephon
 Chaerephon bregullae 
Family: Emballonuridae
Genus: Emballonura
 Polynesian sheath-tailed bat, Emballonura semicaudata

Order: Cetacea (whales) 

The order Cetacea includes whales, dolphins and porpoises. They are the mammals most fully adapted to aquatic life with a spindle-shaped nearly hairless body, protected by a thick layer of blubber, and forelimbs and tail modified to provide propulsion underwater.

Suborder: Mysticeti
Family: Balaenopteridae
Subfamily: Balaenopterinae
Genus: Balaenoptera
 Dwarf minke whale, Balaenoptera acutorostrata 
 Bryde's whale, Balaenoptera edeni 
 Fin whale, Balaenoptera physalus 
 Pygmy blue whale, Balaenoptera musculus intermedia 
Subfamily: Megapterinae
Genus: Megaptera
 Humpback whale, Megaptera novaeangliae 
Suborder: Odontoceti
Family Physeteridae (sperm whales)
Genus: Physeter
 Sperm whale, Physeter catodon 
Family: Kogiidae
Genus: Kogia
 Pygmy sperm whale, Kogia breviceps 
Family: Ziphidae
Subfamily: Hyperoodontinae
Genus: Mesoplodon
 Blainville's beaked whale, Mesoplodon densirostris 
 Ginkgo-toothed beaked whale, Mesoplodon ginkgodens 
 Hector's beaked whale, Mesoplodon hectori 
Family: Delphinidae (marine dolphins)
Genus: Stenella
 Pantropical spotted dolphin, Stenella attenuata 
Genus: Lagenodelphis
 Fraser's dolphin, Lagenodelphis hosei 
Genus: Feresa
 Pygmy killer whale, Feresa attenuata

Notes

References

See also
List of chordate orders
Lists of mammals by region
List of prehistoric mammals
Mammal classification
List of mammals described in the 2000s

Fiji
Mammals

Fiji